

Belgium
 Belgian Congo – Félix Fuchs, Governor-General of the Belgian Congo (1912–1916)

France
 French Somaliland – Pierre Hubert Auguste Pascal, Governor of French Somaliland (1911–1915)
 Guinea –
 Jean Louis Georges Poiret, acting Lieutenant-Governor of Guinea (1912–1913)
 Jean Jules Émile Peuvergne, Lieutenant-Governor of Guinea (1913–1915)

Japan
 Karafuto – Hiraoka Teitarō, Governor-General of Karafuto (12 June 1908 – 5 June 1914)
 Korea – Terauchi Masatake, Governor-General of Korea (1910–1916)
 Taiwan – Sakuma Samata, Governor-General of Taiwan (15 April 1906 – May 1915)

Portugal
 Angola – José Mendes Ribeiro Norton de Matos, Governor-General of Angola (1912–1915)

United Kingdom
 Australia –
Governor-General – Lord Denman, Governor-General of Australia (1911–1914)
Prime Minister –
 Andrew Fisher, Prime Minister of Australia (1910–1913)
 Joseph Cook, Prime Minister of Australia (1913–1914)
 The Bahamas – Sir George Haddon-Smith, Governor of the Bahamas (1912–1914)
 Bahrain
Native Ruler (Hakim) – `Isa ibn Ali Al Khalifah, Ruler of Bahrain (1869–1932)
British Political Agent – Arthur Prescott Trevor, British Political Agent in Bahrain (1912–1914)
 Barbados – Sir Leslie Probyn, Governor of Barbados (1911–1918)
 Basutoland –
Paramount Chief – Nathaniel Griffith Lerotholi, Paramount Chief of Basutoland (1913–1939)
High Commissioner – Viscount Gladstone, High Commissioner for Southern Africa (1910–1914)
Resident Commissioner – Sir Herbert Sloley, Resident Commissioner of Basutoland (1902–1916)
 Bechuanaland
High Commissioner – Viscount Gladstone, High Commissioner for Southern Africa (1910–1914)
Resident Commissioner – Francis William Panzera, Resident Commissioner of Bechuanaland (1906–1916)
 Bermuda – Sir George Mockworth Bullock, Governor of Bermuda (1912–1917)
 British East Africa – Sir Henry Conway Belfield, Governor of British East Africa (1912–1917)
 British Guiana – Sir Walter Egerton, Governor of British Guiana (1912–1917)
 British Honduras – Wilfred Collet, Governor of British Honduras (1913–1918)
 Brunei
Sultan – Muhammad Jamalul Alam, Sultan of Brunei (1906–1924)
Regent – Council of Regency (1906–1918)
British Resident – Francis William Douglas, British Resident in Brunei (1913–1915)
 Canada
Governor-General – The Duke of Connaught, Governor-General of Canada (1911–1916)
Prime Minister – Robert Laird Borden, Prime Minister of Canada (1911–1920)
 Cyprus – Hamilton Goold-Adams, High Commissioner of Cyprus (1911–1915)
 Egypt
Monarch – Abbas Hilmi Pasha, Khedive of Egypt (1892–1914)
Prime Minister – Muhammad Said Pasha, Prime Minister of Egypt (1910–1914)
British Agent – Viscount Kitchener, British-Consul General in Egypt (1911–1914)
 Falkland Islands – William Lamond Allardyce, Governor of the Falkland Islands (1904–1915)
 Fiji – Sir Ernest Sweet-Escott, Governor of Fiji (1912–1918)
 The Gambia – Henry Lionel Galway, Governor of The Gambia (1911–1914)
 Gibraltar – Sir Herbert Miles, Governor of Gibraltar (1913–1918)
 Gilbert and Ellice Islands – Edward Carlyon Eliot, Resident Commissioner of the Gilbert and Ellice Islands
 Gold Coast – Sir Hugh Clifford, Governor of Gold Coast (1912–1919)
 Guernsey'
Lieutenant Governor – Edward Owen Fisher Hamilton, Lieutenant Governor of Guernsey (1911–1914)
Bailiff – William Carey, Bailiff of Guernsey (1908–1915)
 Hong Kong – Sir Francis May, Governor of Hong Kong (1912–1919)
 India – Lord Hardinge of Penshurst, Viceroy and Governor-General of India (1910–1916)
 Ireland – The Earl of Aberdeen, Lord Lieutenant of Ireland (1905–1915)
 Isle of Man – Lord Raglan, Lieutenant Governor of the Isle of Man (1902–1918)
 Jamaica – Sir William Manning, Governor of Jamaica (1913–1918)
 Jersey
Lieutenant Governor – Sir Alexander Rochefort, Lieutenant Governor of Jersey (1910–1916)
Bailiff – Sir William Venables-Vernon, Bailiff of Jersey (1899–1931)
 Kuwait
Native Ruler – Mubarak al-Lahab Al Sabah, Ruler of Kuwait (1896–1915)
British Political Agent – William Henry Irvine Shakespear, British political agent in Kuwait (1909–1914)
 Leeward Islands – Sir Henry Bell, Governor of the Leeward Islands (1912–1916)
 Malta Colony – Leslie Rundle, Governor of Malta (1909–1915)
 Dominion of Newfoundland
Governor – Sir Walter Davidson, Governor of Newfoundland (1913–1917)
Prime Minister – Sir Edward Morris, Prime Minister of Newfoundland (1909–1917)
 Northern Rhodesia – Lawrence Aubrey Wallace, Administrator of Northern Rhodesia (1911–1921)
 Nyasaland – Sir George Smith, Governor of Nyasaland (1913–1923)
 Windward Islands – Sir James Sadler, Governor of the Windward Islands (1909–1914)

Colonial governors
Colonial governors
1913